A total solar eclipse will occur on June 25, 2150. It will be the longest total eclipse since the 11th century. A solar eclipse occurs when the Moon passes between Earth and the Sun, thereby totally or partly obscuring the image of the Sun for a viewer on Earth. A total solar eclipse occurs when the Moon's apparent diameter is larger than the Sun's, blocking all direct sunlight, turning day into darkness. Totality occurs in a narrow path across Earth's surface, with the partial solar eclipse visible over a surrounding region thousands of kilometres wide.

This will be the first total solar eclipse to exceed 7 minutes in term of duration since June 30, 1973. Totality will start in the Lesser Sunda Islands in Indonesia, continue across the northern Pacific Ocean, and end in the eastern Pacific.

Related eclipses

Saros 139

References 

 NASA Solar eclipses: 2101 to 2200
 NASA graphics
 NASA googlemap of eclipse path

2150 06 25
2150 06 25
2150 06 25
2150s